Aslauga bitjensis is a butterfly in the family Lycaenidae. It is found in Cameroon.

References

External links
Images representing Aslauga bitjensis at Barcodes of Life

Butterflies described in 1925
Aslauga
Endemic fauna of Cameroon
Butterflies of Africa